3D Vision Records is an Ibiza, Spain based French psy-trance record label formed by Christof Drouillet (aka Absolum) and Cédric Dassulle (aka Talamasca) in 1998.

See also
List of record labels
Psychedelic trance
Goa trance music

References

External links
Official website
3D Vision Recordings SoundCloud
3D Vision Records' Discogs
Label discography at Psychedlic Mind Expander

French record labels
Psychedelic trance record labels
Record labels established in 1998
Spanish record labels